The Roewe iMAX8 is a minivan produced by SAIC Motor under the Roewe marque since 2020. It was revealed in September 2020 at Auto China.

Overview

Concepts
The Roewe iMAX8 was first previewed by the Vision-iM concept at Auto Guangzhou in November 2019 under Roewe's Vision series of concept vehicles, then as a more-detailed concept called iM8 at the Roewe Brand Day event in May 2020.

Production model
The iMAX8 was revealed in September 2020 at the 2020 Auto China event in Beijing, China, as a production model with few changes from the iM8 concept. It is based on the all new SIGMA platform developed by SAIC Motor.

The iMAX8 is only available in petrol version at launch. The petrol version is powered by a 2.0-litre turbocharged four-cylinder engine delivering  mated to an Aisin eight-speed automatic transmission. Production of the iMAX8 is planned to start in autumn of 2020. It is the first minivan under the Roewe brand.

Features
The Roewe iMAX8 features include a digital instrument cluster, automatic climate control, and keyless entry.

References

Imax8
Cars of China
Cars introduced in 2020
Minivans